The Writers Guild of America Award for Best Television Writing in Daytime Serials is an award presented by the Writers Guild of America to the best written television daytime serials since the 25th annual Writers Guild of America Awards in 1973. The winners are indicated in bold.

Winners and nominees

1970s

1980s

1990s

2000s

2010s

2020s

Programs with multiple awards
12 awards
Ryan's Hope (ABC)

9 awards
General Hospital (ABC)

6 awards
The Young and the Restless (CBS)

5 awards
All My Children (ABC)

4 awards
Days of Our Lives (NBC)

3 awards
Search for Tomorrow (NBC)
Guiding Light (CBS)
As the World Turns (CBS)

2 awards
One Life to Live (ABC)

Programs with multiple nominations
18 nominations
Days of Our Lives (NBC)
General Hospital (ABC)

16 nominations
All My Children (ABC)

13 nominations
Ryan's Hope (ABC)
Guiding Light (CBS)

12 nominations
The Young and the Restless (CBS)

11 nominations
One Life to Live (ABC)

9 nominations
As the World Turns (CBS)

4 nominations
Love of Life (CBS)
The Edge of Night (CBS)
Another World (NBC)

3 nominations
Search for Tomorrow (NBC)
Santa Barbara (NBC)

2 nominations
The Doctors (NBC)
Texas (NBC)

References

Writers Guild of America Awards